Liolaemus tenuis, known as the jewel lizard, is a species of lizard in the family Iguanidae. Other names are thin tree iguana, slender lizard and thin lizard. 
It is endemic to Chile.

It is a relatively small species, with a 5.5 cm snout–vent length. Of diurnal habits, it feeds mainly of insects. It is sometimes kept as a pet.

References

Profesorenlinea.cl: Lagartija tenue
Silvestreschile: Liolaemus tenuis
Podarcis: How to keep lizards
Jewel Lizards info

External links

 Liolaemus tenuis at The Reptile Database

tenuis
Lizards of South America
Endemic fauna of Chile
Reptiles of Chile
Reptiles described in 1837
Taxa named by André Marie Constant Duméril
Taxa named by Gabriel Bibron